is a passenger railway station in located in the city of Wakayama, Wakayama Prefecture, Japan, operated by West Japan Railway Company (JR West).

Lines
Senda Station is served by the Wakayama Line, and is located 81.4 kilometers from the terminus of the line at Ōji Station.

Station layout
The station consists of one side platform serving a single bi-directional track. There is no station building, but only a shelter on the platform, and the station is unattended.

Adjacent stations

|-

History
Senda Station opened on October 1,1952. With the privatization of the Japan National Railways (JNR) on April 1, 1987, the station came under the aegis of the West Japan Railway Company.

Passenger statistics
In fiscal 2019, the station was used by an average of 187 passengers daily (boarding passengers only).

Surrounding Area
The station is located in a rural area surrounded by fields.

See also
List of railway stations in Japan

References

External links

 Senda Station Official Site

Railway stations in Wakayama Prefecture
Railway stations in Japan opened in 1952
Wakayama (city)